The Studd Challenge Trophy was presented annually from 1898 for the best performance by a
Royal Polytechnic Institution athlete during the previous year.

History
The winners' names are engraved in marble on the staircase wall at the back of the Regent Street foyer of what is now the headquarters of the University of Westminster. Many of the Studd Trophy winners
were Olympic or national champions in their particular sport. The trophy is named after Sir John Edward Kynaston Studd.

Winners
Frank Parks (1875–1945) in 1902.
Willie Applegarth in 1912–13
Albert Hill in 1919–20
Harry Edward in 1922
Jack London in 1928
Alan Pascoe in 1971, 1972, 1973, 1974, 1975

References

University of Westminster
Boxing awards